Top Model po-russki, cycle 3  was  the third installment of the Russian adaptation of Tyra Banks' America's Next Top Model. The show aired on Muz-TV from March to May 2012 and featured a cast of fourteen new contestants. All panel members of the previous cycle remained in place.

The prize package for this cycle grew slightly, and included a fashion spread in Cosmopolitan magazine as well as a cover appearance in Cosmopolitan Beauty, a trip to a spa resort in Slovenia courtesy of Orsoten Slim, a brand new Ford Fiesta, and a one-year modeling contract with Wilhelmina Models.

The winner of the competition was 20-year-old Tatyana Kozuto from Yoshkar-Ola.

Cast

Contestants
(Ages stated are at start of contest)

Judges
 Ksenia Sobchak (host)
 Vlad Lisovets
 Danila Polyakov
 Inna Zobova

Episodes

Results

 The contestant was eliminated
 The contestant won the competition

 In episode 1, there was no actual call-out, as Ksenia only called the names of the semi-finalists that were being eliminated.
 In episode 5, Valeria and Yana landed in the bottom two, but were both eliminated.

References

Top Model series (Russia)
2012 Russian television seasons